The Arch of Reunification, officially the Monument to the Three-Point Charter for National Reunification, is a sculptural arch located south of Pyongyang, the capital of North Korea. It was opened in August 2001 to commemorate Korean reunification proposals put forward by Kim Il-sung.

The concrete arch straddles the multi-laned Reunification Highway leading from Pyongyang to the DMZ. It consists of two Korean women in traditional dress, symbolizing the North and the South, leaning forward to jointly uphold a sphere bearing a map of a reunified Korea. The sphere is the emblem of the Three Charters; the Three Principles of National Reunification; the Plan of Establishing the Democratic Federal Republic of Korea and the Ten Point Program of the Great Unity of the Whole Nation. The original plan was to have a 55-metre pillar with three branches to represent Koreans in the north, the south, and overseas.

The plinth of the structure is engraved with messages of support for reunification and peace from various individuals, organizations, and nations.

The arch appeared on a postage stamp in 2002.

References

External links

 Monument to the Three Charters for National Reunification at Naenara

Buildings and structures in Pyongyang
Monuments and memorials in North Korea
Arches and vaults
North Korea–South Korea relations
Outdoor sculptures in North Korea
2001 establishments in North Korea